Helenaea is a genus of beetles in the family Carabidae, containing the following species:

 Helenaea bisignata Baehr, 2003
 Helenaea felixi Deuve, 2007
 Helenaea torretassoi Schatzmayr & Koch, 1934

References

Psydrinae